The Spanish Gardener may refer to:

 The Spanish Gardener (novel), 1950 novel
 The Spanish Gardener (film), 1956 film based on the novel